The following is a list of University of North Texas College of Music faculty

Faculty 

 Samuel Adler
 Elie Apper
 Violet Archer
 Larry Austin
 Colin Bailey
 Wilfred Bain
 Joseph Banowetz
 Robert Blocker
 Emanuel Borok
 Jeff Bradetich
 Leon Breeden
 Anshel Brusilow
 Leonard Candelaria ‡
 Eugene Corporon
 Eugene Conley
 Richard Croft ‡
 Lella Cuberli
 Richard Dufallo
 Willard Elliot ‡
 Merrill Ellis
 Marjorie Fulton
 John Giordano ‡
 Carroll Glenn
 Floyd Graham ‡
 Gene Hall ‡
 David Itkin
 Otto Kinkeldey
 Tosca Kramer
 William P. Latham
 Martin Mailman
 Rich Matteson
 Maurice McAdow
 Mary McCormic
 Eliza Jane McKissack
 Cindy McTee
 Dika Newlin
 Norbert Nozy
 Adolfo Odnoposoff
 Jack Petersen ‡
 Darhyl S. Ramsey
 Debra Richtmeyer
 Jim Riggs ‡
 Jay Saunders ‡
 Silvio Scionti
 Lynn Seaton
 Geoffrey Simon
 Ed Soph ‡
 Richard Sparks
 Vladimir Viardo
 Joelle Wallach
 Steve Wiest ‡

‡ Alumni

See also 
 List of University of North Texas College of Music alumni

List Of Faculty
Lists of people by university or college in Texas